Hedruridae is a family of nematodes belonging to the order Rhabditida.

Genera:
 Hedruris Nitzsch, 1821

References

Nematodes